The following lists events that happened during 1979 in the Grand Duchy of Luxembourg.

Incumbents

Events

January – March
 1 January – The communes of Arsdorf, Bigonville, Folschette, and Perlé are merged to form the new commune of Rambrouch.
 1 January – The communes of Harlange and Mecher are merged to form the new commune of Lac de la Haute-Sûre.
 1 January – The commune of Rodenbourg is merged into the commune of Junglinster.
 30 January – Cargolux receives delivery of its first Boeing 747-200, becoming the first European cargo-only airline to operate a Jumbo Jet.
 19 March – The government, steel companies, and trade unions reach an agreement on restructuring the steel industry.
 31 March – Representing Luxembourg, Jeane Manson finishes thirteenth in the Eurovision Song Contest 1979 with the song J'ai déjà vu ça dans tes yeux.

April – June
 9 May - Monsanto Company closes its production facility at Echternach after 13 years of operation, with the loss of 750 jobs.
 9 June – Native Luxembourger Lucien Didier wins the 1979 Tour de Luxembourg.
 10 June – Legislative and European elections are held.  In the Chamber of Deputies, the CSV win another six seats, with all three left wing parties losing three deputies each.

July – September
 16 July – After the elections of 10 June, Pierre Werner forms a new government as Prime Minister, with his predecessor Gaston Thorn as his Deputy Prime Minister.

October – December
 3 December – Ministers from France, Germany, and Luxembourg meet in Bonn.  Germany and Luxembourg protest against France's plans to allow the construction of a nuclear power plant at Cattenom, but in vain.

Births
 2 July – Claudine Muno, journalist and musician
 11 December - Jean Muller, pianist

Deaths
 3 January - Gilbert Dussier, footballer
 29 January – René Deltgen, actor
 11 April - Marguerite Thomas-Clement, politician
 28 December – Paul Wilwertz, politician

Footnotes

References